Latour-de-Carol is a commune in the Pyrénées-Orientales department in southern France.

Geography

Localization 
Latour-de-Carol is located in the canton of Les Pyrénées catalanes and in the arrondissement of Prades.

Transport 
The village's main claim to fame is as the site of the international railway station, Gare de Latour-de-Carol-Enveitg. This station is the terminus of three lines, each with different gauges:
 the Spanish state operator Renfe's  gauge line running north from Barcelona via Ripoll
 the French state operator SNCF's  gauge line running south from Toulouse via Foix
 SNCF's  gauge line (known as the Yellow Train) running west from Villefranche-de-Conflent

As the French and Spanish tracks are different gauges, no trains run the whole way from Toulouse to Barcelona. Passengers have to change trains, which are however no longer scheduled to offer direct connections. Occasional freight-trains cross the border and are worked to Puigcerda, where freight is transferred. The double-track line to Puigcerda consists of two separate tracks with different gauges and electrified at different currents.

European route E09 and part of the Route nationale 20 connect Latour-de-Carol with Bourg-Madame (near the border with Spain) and Foix.

Population

See also
 Break of gauge
Communes of the Pyrénées-Orientales department

References

External links
Railways through Europe: Latour de Carol - Enveigt

Communes of Pyrénées-Orientales